Robert B. Weide (born June 20, 1959) is an American screenwriter, producer, and director. He has directed a number of documentaries and was the principal director and an executive producer of Curb Your Enthusiasm for the show's first five years. His documentaries have focused on four comedians: W. C. Fields, Mort Sahl, Lenny Bruce, and Woody Allen. His latest documentary, Kurt Vonnegut: Unstuck in Time (2021), explores the life and works of Kurt Vonnegut.

Weide has received an Academy Award nomination and Primetime Emmy Award win for Lenny Bruce: Swear to Tell the Truth (1999). He also received Emmy Awards for W. C. Fields: Head Up (1986), and Curb Your Enthusiasm.

Early work and education 
Weide began working with film at an early job inspecting 16 mm educational films at the Fullerton Public Library in Orange County, California.

In 1978, while taking film production courses at Orange Coast College in Costa Mesa, California, Weide decided to produce a documentary film on the Marx Brothers, inspired by his love of their work. Undeterred by repeated rejections of his applications to the USC School of Cinema-Television, he worked on the project on his own time and with help from Charles H. Joffe got the rights to clips necessary to make the film. The Marx Brothers in a Nutshell was broadcast in 1982 on PBS and became "one of the highest-rated programs in PBS history".

Career 
W. C. Fields: Straight Up (1986)Weide co-wrote W. C. Fields: Straight Up (1986) with Joseph Adamson and Ronald J. Fields. Adamson directed it, and Dudley Moore narrated. In an interview with The Los Angeles Times, Weide said: "The film is 94 minutes long. We had access to all of his feature films, and clips from 1915 on. We have newsreel footage, outtakes, and material never seen before. We also have interviews with people who knew and/or worked with Fields, or have special knowledge of him, including Joseph L. Mankiewicz, Will Fowler, Madge Kennedy, who played in the 1923 stage production of ‘Poppy’ and co-starred in the movie, Leonard Maltin, Ronald J. Fields, propman Harry Caplan and an audio interview with the grown-up Baby Leroy."Mort Sahl: The Loyal Opposition (1989)Weide's next project concerned the career of Mort Sahl. The project was part of the American Masters documentary series, which originally ran on PBS in 1989.Lenny Bruce: Swear to Tell the Truth (1998)In 1998, Weide directed the documentary Swear to Tell the Truth, which received a nomination for the Academy Award for Best Documentary. Robert De Niro narrated it, and it featured interviews with Bruce's ex-wife Honey, mother Sally Marr and former TV host Steve Allen, who had Bruce on his show a few times. The film debuted on HBO.Curb Your Enthusiasm

From 2000 to 2005, Weide served as principal director and an executive producer of Larry David's HBO comedy series Curb Your Enthusiasm. He became involved in the series after receiving a script by David titled "Prognosis Negative". In 1998 David told Weide that HBO was interested in doing a comedy special about David's return to stand-up—"ostensibly a documentary with some behind-the-scenes footage. And he told me he wanted me to direct it." The special turned out to be the beginning of the series. Since then David and Weide have often collaborated, with Weide serving as a director and executive producer. Weide returned with the show in 2007, directing "The Anonymous Donor", and has continued to guest direct since.

Weide received several Primetime Emmy Award nominations for his work on the show and won an Emmy in 2003 for his work as director during its third season. His ending credit on the show became part of a popular meme.

How to Lose Friends & Alienate People

Weide's first feature film as director, How to Lose Friends & Alienate People, was released in October 2008, to generally unfavorable reviews, though it topped the United Kingdom's box office during its opening weekend.

Woody Allen: A Documentary (2011)

Weide's next documentary, Woody Allen: A Documentary, explored the career of filmmaker and comedian Woody Allen as part of PBS's American Masters series. The film takes a look at Allen's nearly seven-decade career as a director and comedian. It features interviews with Allen, Diane Keaton, Scarlett Johansson, Martin Scorsese, Chris Rock, Owen Wilson, Larry David, Penelope Cruz, and Leonard Maltin. It received favorable reviews, earning a 90% on Rotten Tomatoes based on 21 reviews. The website's critical consensus states: "Driving aside the most polemical aspects of the director's biography, Woody Allen: A Documentary draws an interesting picture of the filmmaker's opus while allowing some glimpses of his intense personal life." The New Yorker critic Richard Brody wrote: "It's a close look at how Allen's career was shaped, from his Brooklyn youth to his precocious launch as a comedy writer, his rise to local fame as a standup comedian and to national celebrity on television, his move from screenwriter to director of the 'early, funny' films to internationally lionized auteur to pariah and, gradually, back again."

Weide was the director and main writer for Mr. Sloane, a 2014 British comedy series.

Work with Kurt Vonnegut

Weide wrote and produced the 1996 film adaptation of Kurt Vonnegut's Mother Night. With Vonnegut's support, Weide chronicled him on film starting in 1988 and has obtained footage of him from 16 mm home movies dating back to 1925. Weide was also working on a film adaptation of The Sirens of Titan until the film rights were sold to another producer.

Writing under the pseudonym Wyaduck (a Marx Brothers reference), Weide was a frequent poster to Usenet group alt.books.kurt-vonnegut, where he reported on the progress of the Mother Night project. He was mentioned in Vonnegut's Timequake.

In 2001, Weide directed a revival of Vonnegut's play Happy Birthday, Wanda June starring his wife, Linda Bates, as Penelope.

Filmography 
As writer

As director

Awards and nominations

Personal life 
Weide married actress Linda Bates. His marriage to her and her subsequent issues with progressive supranuclear palsy are chronicled in Kurt Vonnegut: Unstuck in Time.

References

External links
 
 Biography from the HBO website
 40-Minute audio interview with Robert Weide on The Sound of Young America

1959 births
Place of birth missing (living people)
American documentary filmmakers
American film producers
American male screenwriters
American television directors
American television producers
American television writers
Primetime Emmy Award winners
Living people
Directors Guild of America Award winners
American male television writers